John Angus MacLean   (May 15, 1914 – February 15, 2000) was a politician and farmer in Prince Edward Island, Canada.

He was an alumnus of both Mount Allison University and the University of British Columbia with degrees in science. MacLean left farming to enlist in the Royal Canadian Air Force during World War II, serving from 1939–1947 and achieving the rank of Wing Commander.

MacLean's bomber was shot down, and he evaded capture in Nazi-occupied Europe with the help of the Belgian escape-line Comète with Andrée De Jongh.

MacLean returned to Prince Edward Island after the war, and ran for a seat in the House of Commons of Canada as a Progressive Conservative Party of Canada candidate, but was defeated in the 1945 and 1949 federal elections.

He was first elected to Parliament in a 1951 by-election and held his seat continuously until he left federal politics in 1976. MacLean served in the cabinet of Prime Minister John Diefenbaker as Minister of Fisheries from 1957 until the government's defeat in the 1963 election.

In 1976, MacLean was persuaded to leave federal politics and take the leadership of the Progressive Conservative Party of Prince Edward Island which had languished in opposition for a decade. On 8 November 1976, MacLean was elected to the provincial legislature in a by-election. MacLean led the party to victory in 1979, and formed a government that emphasized rural community life, banned new shopping malls and instituted a Royal Commission to examine land use and sprawl. His government cancelled the province's participation in the Point Lepreau Nuclear Generating Station in New Brunswick.

On 17 August 1981, MacLean announced his intention to resign as premier upon the election of a new party leader. MacLean retired as premier on 17 November 1981, when James Lee was sworn-in as his successor and did not run in the 1982 provincial election. He returned to the family farm that he redeveloped for low-intensity blueberry farming.  A respected steward of the land and of rural communities, MacLean was a committed Presbyterian of Scottish descent.  In 1991, he was made an Officer of the Order of Canada.

He died in Charlottetown on February 15, 2000.

Electoral record

References

External links
 
 

1914 births
2000 deaths
Canadian Presbyterians
People from Queens County, Prince Edward Island
Royal Canadian Air Force officers
Recipients of the Distinguished Flying Cross (United Kingdom)
Members of the House of Commons of Canada from Prince Edward Island
Officers of the Order of Canada
Premiers of Prince Edward Island
Progressive Conservative Party of Canada MPs
Members of the King's Privy Council for Canada
Mount Allison University alumni
University of British Columbia alumni
Canadian people of Scottish descent
Progressive Conservative Party of Prince Edward Island MLAs
Progressive Conservative Party of Prince Edward Island leaders